Thomas Joseph Bruce (born March 29, 1982) is an American college baseball coach, who is the current associate head baseball coach for the TCU Horned Frogs. He served as head coach of the Nevada Wolf Pack (2016–2022).

Early life and college baseball career
Born in Torrance, California, Bruce graduated from St. John Bosco High School in 2000. In high school, Bruce played baseball and soccer and earned all-state honors as a senior shortstop for the baseball team.

After high school, Bruce attended a local junior college, Cerritos College, for two years and played on the baseball team, batting .312 with 30 RBI in the 2001 and 2002 seasons. Bruce transferred to Texas Tech, batting .321 with 38 RBI.

Bruce transferred to California State University, Long Beach for his senior season and played one season for the Long Beach State Dirtbags in 2004 under head coach Mike Weathers, batting .186 with 11 RBI in 40 games with 31 starts, helping Long Beach State host an NCAA Super Regional.

Coaching career

Early coaching career (2005–2015)
While completing his bachelor's degree, Bruce was an undergraduate assistant coach at Long Beach State in 2005. In 2006, Bruce returned to Cerritos as an assistant coach. Bruce then served as an assistant coach at Long Beach State from 2007 to 2010, with NCAA Tournament appearances in 2007 and 2008.

From 2011 to 2015, Bruce was an assistant coach at UCLA under John Savage. With Bruce on staff, UCLA won three Pac-12 Conference titles and appeared in the 2013 College World Series.

Nevada (2016–present)
On June 26, 2015, Bruce got his first head coaching job at the University of Nevada, Reno. In his debut season as head coach, Bruce led Nevada to a 37–24 (20–10 Mountain West Conference) record, a tie for second place in conference standings, and a runner-up finish in the Mountain West Tournament. A D1Baseball.com poll that year ranked Bruce the seventh best recruiter in NCAA Division I baseball.

In 2017, Nevada fell to a 19–36 record. However, Nevada bounced back in 2018 to a 29–24 (20–9 MW) record and first-place finish in conference standings, the second regular season conference title since 2015. Bruce was named Mountain West Coach of the Year in 2018. The 2019 Nevada team finished 30–26.

In 2020, Nevada finished with a 2–12 record; the NCAA canceled all spring sports in mid-March due to COVID-19.

For the second time under Bruce, Nevada won the Mountain West regular season championship in 2021, and Bruce earned his second Coach of the Year honors from the MW. With a 25–20 record, the 2021 Nevada team also qualified for the NCAA Tournament for the first time since 2000 and first time in Bruce's tenure.

Nevada finished 29–26 (18–12 MW) and second in conference standings in 2022.

Head coaching record

See also
 List of current NCAA Division I baseball coaches

References

1982 births
Living people
Baseball shortstops
Cerritos Falcons baseball players
Texas Tech Red Raiders baseball players
Long Beach State Dirtbags baseball players
Long Beach State Dirtbags baseball coaches
Cerritos Falcons baseball coaches
UCLA Bruins baseball coaches
Nevada Wolf Pack baseball coaches
Baseball players from Torrance, California
Baseball players from Long Beach, California
TCU Horned Frogs baseball coaches
Baseball coaches from California